Austreberto Morales Ramirez (born August 24, 1932) is a Mexican artist.

Austreberto was born in Cuitzeo, Michoacán. He started studying art in Mexico City at the Academia de San Carlos. In 1960 he held his first solo-show and later exhibited widely in cities such as Tijuana, Acapulco, Querétaro, Guadalajara and  Monterrey in Mexico. His work has also been the subject of numerous international exhibitions in San Diego CA, Hollywood CA, San Francisco CA, Beverly Hills CA, Seville and Madrid in Spain.

References 
Artspawn. "Biography of Austreberto Morales", Biographical information about Austreberto Morales at Artspawn.

20th-century Mexican painters
Mexican male painters
21st-century Mexican painters
Artists from Michoacán
1932 births
Living people
20th-century Mexican male artists
21st-century Mexican male artists